Robigana is a rural locality in the local government area (LGA) of West Tamar in the Launceston LGA region of Tasmania. The 2016 census recorded a population of 111 for the state suburb of Robigana.

History 
Robigana was gazetted as a locality in 1966. The name was in use by 1914. It is believed to be an Aboriginal word for “swan”.

Geography
The waters of the Tamar River Estuary form part of the northern boundary.

Road infrastructure 
Route C728 (Deviot Road) passes through from south-east to north.

References

Towns in Tasmania
Localities of West Tamar Council